"Everybody Makes Mistakes" is a song co-written and recorded by American country music artist Lacy J. Dalton.  It was released in December 1981 as the second single from the album Takin' It Easy.  The song reached number 5 on the Billboard Hot Country Singles & Tracks chart.  The song was written by Dalton and Mark Sherrill.

Chart performance

References

1982 singles
1981 songs
Lacy J. Dalton songs
Song recordings produced by Billy Sherrill
Columbia Records singles
Songs written by Lacy J. Dalton
Songs written by Mark Sherrill